Lali Espósito is an Argentine singer and actress. Her music career started in 2003 when she contributed vocals to the soundtrack album for the Argentine telenovela, Rincón de Luz.  From 2007 to 2012, the singer was part of the pop-group Teen Angels, derived from the television series Casi Ángeles in which she also starred from the same from 2007 to 2010. In 2013 Espósito also began to work as an independent artist outside of Teen Angels. Later that year, the singer released four songs for the Argentine telenovela Solamente Vos in which she starred. Her debut single "A Bailar" was released the same year.

A Bailar was released in March 2014. It was preceded by the release of the second single, "Asesina".  Follow-up singles included "Mil Años Luz", "Del Otro Lado" and "Histeria". All the songs from the album were written by Espósito and music producers Pablo Akselrad, Luis Burgio and Gustavo Novello, except for "Desamor" and "Being" that were also composed by Antonella Giunta.

In 2015, Espósito appeared on nine of the eleven tracks of the soundtrack for "Esperanza Mía". The singer co-wrote two songs for the album including "Júrame" and "Esperanza Mía". Other notable contributing songwriters on Esperanza Mía include Luciano Pereyra who co-wrote "Cómo Haremos", Alejandro Sergi of Miranda! who composed "El Ritmo del Momento", Florencia Bertotti who co-wrote "Me Muero por Vos" and "Paul Schwartz who co-wrote all the tracks in where Esósito appears, except for "El Ritmo del Momento".

"Soy" was released as the lead single of Espósito's second studio album, Soy, in 2016. The song was written by Espósito, Novello, Akselrad and Burgio.

Songs

Unreleased songs

See also
Lali Espósito discography

References

 
Esposito, Lali